Aircraft design may refer to:

An aircraft design as defined by type definition documentation:
Type certificate, for certified aircraft 
Airworthiness certificate, a legal document
Standard Airworthiness Certificate, for certified aircraft
Special Airworthiness Certificate, for non-certified aircraft types
Aircraft design process, the process of creating an individual aircraft design
Aircraft Designs, an aircraft design and manufacturing firm based in Monterey, California, United States

See also
Aircraft designer, the person, or team of people, who design aircraft
:Category:Aviation inventors
:Category:Aerospace engineers